Senator Nichols may refer to:

Andy Nichols (1937–2001), Arizona State Senate
Asher P. Nichols (1815–1880), New York State Senate
Bill Nichols (politician) (1918–1988), Alabama State Senate
Haskell L. Nichols (1896–1991), Michigan State Senate
Hugh L. Nichols (1865–1942), Ohio State Senate
Jonathan Nichols (Oklahoma politician) (1965–2019), Oklahoma State Senate
Malcolm Nichols (1876–1950), Massachusetts State Senate
Ralph Nichols (American football) (1874–1949), Washington State Senate
Robert Nichols (politician) (born 1944), Texas State Senate
William T. Nichols (1829–1882), Vermont State Senate

See also
John C. Nicholls (1834–1893), Georgia State Senate
William E. Nichol (1918–2006), Nebraska State Senate
Courtlandt Nicoll (1880–1938), New York State Senate
Senator Nicholas (disambiguation)